Grizzly Bear Creek may refer to:

Grizzly Bear Creek (Alberta)
Grizzly Bear Creek (South Dakota)